Salsa Romántica is a soft form of salsa music that emerged between the mid-1980s and early 1990s in New York City,  Puerto Rico and the Dominican Republic.  It has been the most commercially successful form of salsa in the last 20 years, despite criticism that it is a pale imitation of "real" salsa, often called "salsa dura."{{Citation needed|reason=There is no source to this fact|date=February 2023}}

Description and origins

Salsa Romántica is a slower, lighter-sounding type of salsa music that La Palabra, a Cuban musician, introduced in the mid-1980s. {{Citation needed|reason=No credible reference for attribution|date=February 2023}} Salsa romántica arose at a time when classic, big-band salsa, popularized by Fania Records was growing on the Latin record charts, including the rise of Latin pop. Salsa Romantica was an adaptation of melodic love songs to a smooth, light salsa backing. The style spang from a single album, Noches Calientes, created in 1984 by Fania producer Luis Ramirez.{{Citation needed|reason=There is no credible reference for this claim|date=February 2023}} Young salseros such as Lalo Rodriguez and the Puerto Rican Eddie Santiago were creating salsa with light frothy songs, with suggestive lyrics." Salsa romantica is distinct from other salsa music styles because it uses a softer/quieter sounding orchestral sounds, ballads set to a slowed down salsa rhythm, and romantic lyrics. Because of the softer orchestra and leisurely rhythm, some have nicknamed this genre "limp salsa".{{cn}}

Criticism

Salsa romántica was heavily influenced by the balada style (or, pop style) of salsa, and is widely criticized by dancers due to the simple compositional style of both types. Traditional salsas give more improvisational ability to the musicians and dancers involved. Though it bears the moniker of a salsa, salsa romántica is considered by most to be inauthentic to the true spirit and style of salsa music. In Cuba, some critics refer to it as the “white” style to differentiate between salsa romántica and traditional salsa.

Critics have also focused on the fact that "true salsa" involved qualified musicianship alongside the intricate composition, while salsa romántica was too systematic. Some say that one of the reasons salsa romántica even came about was due to the cocaine cartel's affinity for it.{{cn}}  

Critics of salsa romántica, especially in the late 1980s and early 1990s, called it a commercialized, watered-down form of Latin pop, {{Citation needed|reason=Which critics?|date=February 2023}}  in which formulaic, sentimental love ballads were simply put to an Afro-Cuban beat—leaving no room for classic salsa's brilliant musical improvisation, or for classic salsa lyrics that tell stories of daily life or provide social and political commentary.

The form today

The strict lines between salsa romántica and classic salsa have been blurring in recent years. Several performers have succeeded in blending elements of salsa romántica and more hard-driving, traditional salsa, including  La India, Tito Rojas, Eddie Santiago, Anthony Cruz, Gilberto Santa Rosa,  and Víctor Manuelle. Jerry Rivera was the first salsero to go triple platinum with his record "Cuenta Conmigo" ("Count on Me") which was all salsa romantica.{{Citation needed|reason=reference to support the claim|date=February 2023}}

La India, Luis Enrique, Giro Lopez, Marc Anthony and Víctor Manuelle are the best-known performers of salsa romántica today. However, Marc Anthony surpasses his colleagues not only in fame, but in sales as well, being the highest selling salsa artist of the past two decades. By blending elements of pop into his songs - as well as making pop versions of his salsa songs - Anthony has been able to establish a loyal fan base of Hispanics of all nationalities, as well as broaden his audience to non-Spanish speaking individuals. Young salseros gravitating to the form include Tito Rojas, Anthony Cruz, Frankie Negrón, Kevin Ceballo, Charlie Cruz, and Jay Lozada.

Omar Alfanno is probably the most prolific songwriter in the salsa romántica genre he was handheld into the business by Salsa Dura songwriter Johnny Ortiz. Other notable composers include Palmer Hernandez and Jorge Luis Piloto.  Antonio "Tony" Moreno, Chino Rodriguez, Sergio George and Julio "Gunda" Merced are some of the most notable producers in the salsa romántica genre.

Despite having many prominent artists and a large fan base, Salsa Romàntica is considered, by older salsa musicians and fans, to be a sad imitation of classic salsa - salsa monga or "limp salsa". This is partially because this form of salsa talks less about political strife and working-class concerns, and more about non-offensive things such as love and parties.

References 

Salsa music
1980s in Latin music
1990s in Latin music